Ji Han-jae (Chi Hon-tsoi) is one of the highest ranking hapkido instructors in the world and founder of Sin Moo Hapkido who appeared in the movie Game of Death with Kung-Fu master Bruce Lee.

Trainee
Born in Andong, Gyeongsangbuk-do, South Korea On October 27th 1936, he began his martial arts training in 1949 under the direction of Choi Yong-sool and reached the rank of 8th dan under Choi. Ji trained with Choi until 1956, when he moved to Seoul to open a school of self-defense in the nation's capital.  Ji trained in the ancient methods of the Korean martial arts, known as Sam Rang Do Tek Gi by a man named Taoist Lee. Though this man's identity can not be confirmed, he is believed to have he trained Ji in meditation, the Korean long staff jangbong (장봉; 長棒)", short staff danbong (단봉; 短棒)" and the unique kicks of Sam Rang Do Tek Gi.

Hapkido master
In 1959 Ji Han-jae combined all of his martial arts knowledge and began to teach hapkido.

Many people consider Ji the founder of hapkido, while others credit his teacher Choi Yong-sool, who referred to his art as yawara (柔) or yukwonsul (柔拳術)". It is commonly claimed by his students that Ji was the first to use the name hapkido for the techniques he was teaching at that time. Choi's first student Seo Bok-seop, however, said in a 1980 interview that Jung Moo Kwan was the first to use the term to refer to the art as well as the symbol of the eagle to represent hapkido./ Regardless, part of the kicking techniques used in the many styles of hapkido is marked by changes implemented by Ji and Kim Moo-hong (also rendered Kim Moo-woong or Kim Moo-hyun) who was also a student of Choi. After studying with Choi, Kim went to a Buddhist temple and learned a kicking art there. Traveling to Seoul in 1961, he lived and trained with Ji for eight months and together, implementing the kicking methods they had both learned, they finalized the kicking curriculum for hapkido, significantly expanding it to include kicks to higher targets and spinning and jumping kicks, none of which were originally part of Choi's system.

In addition, Ji's original Sung Moo Kwan shared space with people who trained in other arts, including Western boxing. Ji and his senior students developed tactics for dealing with boxing, tang soo do, taekwondo and judo and incorporated them into Ji's curriculum.

Promoter of the art
Leaving Daegu for his hometown of Andong, Ji opened his first school, Anmoogwan, in 1956, still calling his art yukwonsul at this time. His earliest students from this period were Kwon Tae-man (who teaches in California today), Yoo Young-woo and Oh Se-lim (former president of the Korea Hapkido Federation).

After less than a year, Ji relocated to Seoul, the nation's capital, in 1957. There he founded Sung Moo Kwan, which would become an influential kwan, or school of hapkido, producing many of the important teachers of the art. His first student was Hwang Deok-kyoo (founder of the Korean Hapkido Association) followed shortly after by Myung Kwang-sik (founder of the World Hapkido Federation), Lee Tae-jun, Kang Jeong-soo. In 1958, students Kim Yong-jin, Jeong Won-seon (Retired 2007-taught in Rockford, Illinois) Han Bong-soo (of Billy Jack movie fame and founder of the International Hapkido Federation), Choi Sea-oh (First man to teach hapkido in the U.S.) and Myung Jae-nam (Founder of the Korea-based International Hapkido Federation and Hankido). Around this time, Ji began to use the name hapkido to promote the art, shortened from the original hapki yukwonsul (合氣柔拳術) name employed at the first school run by Choi Yong-sool and Seo Bok-seob in Daegu in 1951.

In 1961, Kim Moo-hong came to visit Ji and they developed many of the kicking techniques the art is known for.

Organizations
In 1963, Ji was a founding member of the first attempt to create a large organization to include hapkido. Called the Korean Kido Association (Daehan Kidohoe) Choi Yong-sool was elected the first titular chairman with the organization's charter constitution authored by Ji, Choi and Kwon Jang. The association's purpose was to promote martial arts in the public school system and to police officers and government officials. Ji was highly instrumental in organizing this group but Choi appointed another of his top students, Kim Jeong-yoon, to a position above Ji, greatly diminishing his influence.

By 1965, Ji was hapkido instructor for the presidential guard at the Blue House and thereby became acquainted with Park Jong-kyoo, chief of the country's security forces. Unhappy with his lack of input in the Daehan Kidohoe, with political connections and an ever-growing support from his Sung Moo Kwan students, he decided to form his own organization the Korea Hapkido Association with Kim Woo-joong, president of Daewoo Corporation, as the new association's first head.

Later in 1973, seeking to consolidate three of the larger hapkido organizations that had grown over the years, Ji merged his organization with the Korean Hapkido Association, led by his contemporary Kim Moo-hong, and the Korea Hapki Association, headed by one of his former senior students, Myung Jae-nam, to form the large and influential Republic of Korea Hapkido Association (Daehan Min Kuk Hapkido Hyub Hwe).

Politics
Ji Han-jae's political career began to rise quickly when he started teaching hapkido to the president's bodyguards at the Blue House. In 1979, however, President Park Chung-hee was assassinated. Most of those close to Park resigned including his presidential bodyguards and their martial arts instructors, including Ji.

In the ensuing struggle for power, many of those who were in positions of power under Park found themselves out of work, power or influence. In many cases, they were singled out as targets for legal action, whether justified or not.

In one case, wealthy businessmen made financial contributions to martial arts organizations, as was the norm at the time, but several of the contributions were not properly accounted for. Ji and his organization were charged with tax fraud. Though he was generally viewed as not guilty, he was given a prison term of one year. The judge in the case later explained that it was really beyond his control, and that if Ji did not go to jail on this minor charge, he would have been charged with other offenses until he was sent to prison for another charge, perhaps something more serious.

Ji's philosophical view on the matter was that it was worthwhile to experience a year in prison and learn about a side of life few experience. He added that he was able to further develop the spiritual side of his sinmoo (higher mind) hapkido concept while meditating in prison.

Oh Se-lim, one of the earliest students of the art under Ji, was elected the new president of the Republic of Korea Hapkido Association. He re-christened the organization the "Daehan Hapkido Hyub Hwe", a name used in one of hapkido's former organizations over which Ji presided and Oh had been a founding member. The Korea Hapkido Federation (KHF) became the preferred rendering in English. The Korea Hapkido Federation remains one of the most influential of the many hapkido organizations existing in Korea today. To this day the KHF is still run mostly by students of Ji's original Sung Moo Kwan.

Sin Moo Hapkido founder
In 1984, Ji Han-jae moved to the United States and founded Sin Moo Hapkido. Before Ji left Korea, his close friend Myung Jae-nam, the head of the International H.K.D Federation, awarded Ji the rank of 10th dan.

Ji now goes by the title DoJu Ji. Doju (道主) implies founder as Ji is the founder of Sin Moo hapkido, if not hapkido itself.

United States
After Ji moved to the U.S., he attracted a large number of students interested in learning hapkido, especially his Sin Moo style. He teaches several seminars a year in North America, Latin America and Europe. He currently lives in Tucson, Arizona. In 2017, he went to Queens, New York and had a reunion with his Hapkido co-star Angela Mao at her restaurant.

Films
On his first trip to America, Ji appeared in the film Game of Death with Bruce Lee. Ji opted not to appear in the additional footage shot for the 1978 version of the film. He also appeared in the film Hapkido (aka Lady Kung Fu) with Angela Mao.

Filmography

See also
 Choi Yong-sool
 Seo Bok-seob
 Sin Moo Hapkido

References

1936 births
Living people
Martial arts school founders
People from North Gyeongsang Province
South Korean hapkido practitioners